Steve Stanulis (born November 25, 1971 in Staten Island, New York) is an American actor, director, and producer of Italian-Lithuanian descent. He was the bodyguard of Kanye West from 2016 to February 2021.

Early life and education
Stanulis was born in Staten Island, New York. He went to New Dorp High School and went on to graduate from Wagner College.

He studied acting at Manhattan's HB Studios.

Career
Stanulis was a former NYPD policeman. He retired from the force in 2002. He was a Chippendales dancer at Savage Men Dance Troupe. He was the bodyguard of Kanye West from 2016 – February 2021. He also worked with Kanye West at his "SNL" meltdown and events in New York Fashion Week and the Met Gala.

As a producer, Stanulis produced short films like Dick & Jane, Because of You, and The Invisible Life of Thomas Lynch.

Stanulis produced a feature film, Long Shot Louie, and created the play Stripped. He also starred in and produced the comedy-drama The Networker.

As an actor, he was cast in The Replacements and Gangs of New York, The Interpreter, I Now Pronounce You Chuck & Larry, Cupidity, and Over the GW. He has also appeared in TV shows like The Sopranos and The Deuce.

As a director, Stanulis directed Wasted Talent in 2018. It won Best Documentary at the NYCIF. He then directed a horror film called Clinton Road. The film won Best Horror in both the Golden Statuette International Film Festival (GSIFF) and the Philadelphia Independent Film Festival. It was picked up by Midnight Releasing and had a 15 state theatrical release. He also directed a controversial documentary called Race Against Time.

Stanulis also directed and produced films like 5th Borough and Chronicle of a Serial Killer.

Controversy

Stanulis was involved in a controversy that involved Kim Kardashian and Kanye West. West accused him of flirting with Kardashian. West threatened him with a $30 million suit, which he claimed that Stanulis agreed to confidentially.

The former couple gave him a cease-and-desist letter that claimed he made false and defamatory statements, but Stanulis' legal team threatened to countersue.

References

Living people
1971 births
Film directors from New York City
Wagner College alumni